Deh Now-e Derakhti (also Romanized as Deh Now-e Derakhtī and Deh Now Derakhtī; also known as Deh Now and Deh Now-e Vakīlābād) is a village in Posht Rud Rural District, in the Central District of Narmashir County, Kerman Province, Iran. At the 2006 census, its population was 79, in 15 families.

References 

Populated places in Narmashir County